Zdeněk Kolář and Jiří Lehečka were the defending champions but chose not to defend their title.

Henri Squire and Jan-Lennard Struff won the title after defeating Jonathan Eysseric and Albano Olivetti 6–4, 6–7(5–7), [10–7] in the final.

Seeds

Draw

References

External links
 Main draw

Trofeo Faip–Perrel - Doubles
2022 Doubles